The following is a list of mayors of the city of Guarulhos, in  São Paulo state, Brazil.

 Joaquim Francisco de Paula Rabello, 1881-1890 
 Antônio José de Siqueira Bueno, 1890-1891	
 Lúcio Francisco Pereira, 1894-1896	
 João Francisco da Silva Portilho, 1896-1902	 
 Leonardo Valtardi, 1902-1906
 João Teófilo de Assis Ferreira, 1906-1907	
 Gabriel José Antônio, 1908-1915	
 Felício Antônio Alves, 1915-1916	
 Zeferino Pires de Freitas, 1917-1919	
 José Maurício de Oliveira Sobrinho, 1919-1930	
 João Eduardo da Silva, 1930-1931	
 Delezino de Almeida Franco, 1930-1931	
 Alberto Cardoso de Melo, 1931		
 Ariovaldo Panadês, 1931-1932	
 Alfredo Ferreira Paulino Filho, 1932-1933	
 Carlos Panadês, 1933	
 Guilhermino Rodrigues de Lima, 1933-1938	
 Gentil Bicudo Contador, 1936, 1938, 1940, 1945
 José Saraceni, 1936-1938	
 José Moreira Matos, 1938-1940	
 José Maurício de Oliveira, 1940-1945	
 Heitor Maurício de Oliveira, 1945-1947	
 Vasco Elídio Egidio Brancaleoni, 1947	
 João Mendonça Falcão, 1947	
 Olivier Ramos Nogueira, 1947-1948	
 Fioravante Iervolino, 1948-1952, 1957-1961	
 Antônio Prátici, 1952-1953	
 Rinaldo Poli, 1953-1957		
 Mário Antonelli, 1961-1966	
 Francisco Antunes Filho, 1962	
 Waldomiro Pompêo, 1966-1970, 1973-1977
 Alfredo Antonio Nader, 1970	
 Jean Pierre Hermann de Morais Barros, 1970-1973	
 Nefi Tales, 1977-1982	
 Rafael Rodrigues Filho, 1982-1983	
 Oswaldo de Carlos, 1983-1988	
 Paschoal Thomeu, 1988-1989	
 Vicentino Papotto, 1993-1996 
 , 1997-1998
 , 1998-2000	
 , 2001-2008	
 , 2009-2016	
 , 2017-

See also
 
 São Paulo history (state)
 
 List of mayors of largest cities in Brazil (in Portuguese)

References

This article incorporates information from the Portuguese Wikipedia.

Guarulhos